= DTOX =

Mobile smartphone app

- Company type: Private company
- Available in: English
- Headquarters: New York City, New York
- Area served: Worldwide
- Founder: Rae Dylan
- Website: dtoxapp.com
- Registration: Required to use (United States)
- Launched: 2012
- Current status: Active

DTOX is a mobile smartphone app marketed as an aid for people with addictions. The company that makes and sells the app was founded in 2012 by Rae Dylan, a substance abuse counsellor.

Users have access to a day counter that calculates their detox period, daily messages of encouragement, a tracking feature that helps monitor cravings and mood, and a photo journal that keeps a visual record of their progress. Users can use DTOX to record specific emotions at any period during the day. Users can remain anonymous or choose to connect with other DTOX users for support and collaboration. There is also a "fan club" option where a user can sign up family members, sponsors, and coaches for emails updating the user's progress.
